Christopher Douglas (born c.1955) is a British actor and writer.
He is the voice of Ed Reardon in BBC Radio 4's long-running sitcom Ed Reardon's Week, which he co-writes with Andrew Nickolds. Ed Reardon's Week has completed fourteen series and was the winner of the Broadcasting Press Guild's "Best Radio Programme" award in 2005 and again in 2010. Douglas is also the voice and co-creator of the world's most disappointing cricketer Dave Podmore, a Radio 4 regular since 2017.

Other radio credits include a two-part adaptation of George Gissing's New Grub Street, two series of Mastering The Universe, co-written with Nick Newman and starring Dawn French. Also three series of Beauty Of Britain, co-written with Nicola Sanderson and starring Jocelyn Jee Esien.

Christopher Douglas writes and directs the improbably long-running career of uber-thesp Nicholas Craig (Nigel Planer) whose autobiography I, An Actor was first published in 1988, and who has continued to appear on TV and onstage ever since.

Background
Douglas was born in 1955. His father Douglas Neill was an actor, director and TV producer. His mother Carol Howard-Eady was an actress and stage manager. His step-father Derek Clark was briefly an actor before becoming a director and producer, retiring in 1992 as Director of Programmes for HTV. Douglas was educated at Downs Preparatory School and Clifton College. He left school at 15 to work as an assistant stage manager in various regional theatres; Porthcawl, Ilfracombe, Bristol Old Vic, Worcester and the Wyvern, Swindon, where he made his performing debut as the back end of Alfred the Horse. He joined the Young Vic company as an acting ASM in 1972. Douglas took up writing in 1979 but has continued to work as an actor. He is Secretary of The Weekenders Cricket Club.

Writing credits
THEATRE:Theatrical Digs (Edinburgh and New End, 1981), Scout's Honour (Lyric Hammersmith 1987 - Best Comedy nomination, Standard Drama Awards).   An Evening with Nicholas Craig starring Nigel Planer (Hampstead Theatre, National Theatre and touring 1988–2002). Ed Reardon: A Writer's Burden (Edinburgh and tour 2011)
RADIO: The Englishman Abroad (Saturday Night Theatre, 1980).  I, An Actor... (series 1989). Thirty episodes of Dave Podmore, co-written with Nick Newman and Andrew Nickolds (1997-2018),  "Life, Death and Sex with Mike and Sue" (1999), two series of Mastering the Universe, with Nick Newman (2005 & 2009).  Ed Reardon's Week, co-written with Andrew Nickolds (2004–17). Dolly (Radio 4 Afternoon Play, 2009), three series of Beauty of Britain, co-written with Nicola Sanderson (2009–12). New Grub Street (two-part adaptation, 2016)
TV: Tygo Road (co-written with Richard Cottan, BBC 2 series 1990), The Naked Actor (BBC 2 series 1991), The Nicholas Craig Masterclass (BBC 2 series 1992), It's Not Cricket with Rory Bremner (BBC 2 1998), "The Age Thing" (BBC pilot starring Patricia Hodge and Hugh Bonneville 1998), "Film 2004". "How to be Eighteenth-Century" (BBC4 and BBC2 2006), "How to be Sci-Fi" (BBC4 2006), "The Rock and Roll Years" (BBC1 pilot 2006), "Mark Lawson Interviews Nicholas Craig" (BBC4 2008), "How to be Edwardian" (BBC4 2007), "How to be Old" (BBC4 2009) 
BOOKS: Spartan Cricketer, a biography of D.R.Jardine (George Allen & Unwin 1984. Reissued by Methuen in 2002 and 2003).  I, An Actor...  (Pavilion Books 1988, Pan Books 1989 and Methuen 2001, reissued 2008 and again in 2017). Pod Almighty! (Simon and Schuster 1996), The Word of Pod, (Collected columns from The Guardian, Methuen 2002), Ed Reardon’s Week (Simon & Schuster 2005, paperback 2006), ghosted ...and June Whitfield (Transworld 2000) 
JOURNALISM: Guardian columnist (as Dave Podmore) 1996–2006. Numerous other pieces for The Guardian, Times, Independent, Telegraph, Mail on Sunday, Wisden and The Wisden Cricketer. 
DIRECTING: I, An Actor… stage show 2002.  Series 2 of The Nicholas Craig Masterclass (BBC2 1992). "How to be Eighteenth-Century" (BBC4 and BBC2 2006) "How to be Sci-Fi" (BBC4 2006), "How to be Edwardian" (BBC4 2007) and "Mark Lawson Interviews Nicholas Craig" (BBC4 2007), "How to be Old" (BBC4 2009)

Presenting
Pick of the Week Radio 4
Comedy Club Radio 4 Extra
Timeshift BBC2
"The London Residences of George Gissing" (2016)
"200 Years of The Cumberland Market" (2016)

Acting credits
THEATRE: seasons at The Young Vic, Cheltenham and Birmingham.
FILM: The Hireling (Dir. Alan Bridges, 1972). Penda's Fen (Dir. Alan Clarke, 1973).
SHORTS: Dave Podmore in the Fast Lane and Dave Podmore in the Pressure Cooker (Hat Trick 2004), Dave Podmore's Top Cricket Tips (2015), 
TV: Fathers and Families, Secret Army, Cats Eyes, Matilda's England, Crossroads (100+ episodes as Martin, the cheeky barman), Crown Court, Rooms, The Flockton Flyer, four series as Samuel Onedin in The Onedin Line (1977–80), Radio, The Lenny Henry Show, Reilly, Ace of Spies, The Bill, Casualty, Early Travellers to America, The Bill and Sean Show (Hat Trick pilot), Lead Balloon (BBC2 2007), Hey Hey We’re the Monks! (BBC2 2008). 	
RADIO: Member of BBC Radio Drama Company 1983–84. I, An Actor... (Radio 4 series 1989). Twenty-seven Dave Podmore shows (Radio 5 and 4 1997–2017). Mastering the Universe with Dawn French (2006/08). Club of Queer Trades (2005) London Life (2006), Peacefully in Their Sleeps (2007). Gus MacDonald (2008). Dolly (2009). Brian Gulliver's Travels (2011). Beauty of Britain (2009–12).

Publications
 Christopher Douglas, Douglas Jardine: Spartan Cricketer, Methuen, 2003,

References

 BBC Comedy "Mastering the Universe". November 2005. Bio of Christopher Douglas as its writer. Accessed January 2009
 Jardine, Spartan Cricketer by Christopher Douglas Methuen books, Accessed January 2009

External links
 
 

Living people
Year of birth missing (living people)
British male television actors
British male radio actors